Sa'adu Zungur (1915 - 1958) was a Nigerian politician and poet who was among early scholars in Northern Nigeria to call for the reform of the society through education during colonial rule.

Early life and education 
Zungur was born in 1915 in Bauchi. His father was the Limamin Bauchi. He began his elementary schooling at Bauchi Primary School in 1926 and attended Katsina Higher College in 1929. Zungur was at Yaba Technical College in Lagos in 1934.

Career 
After leaving Yaba Technical College in Lagos, Zungur became a teacher at the Kano School of Hygiene until 1940 and then at the Zaria School of Pharmacy where he became the head of the school in 1941. While in Zaria, he formed a Zaria Friendly Society and formed a close friendship and alliance with Aminu Kano. He returned to Bauchi after falling ill with lung sickness.

Politics 
While at Bauchi, Zungur together with Abubakar Tafawa Balewa, Aminu Kano and some Northern elites formed the Bauchi General Improvement Association, one of the first political organisation in Northern Nigeria. In 1949 Aminu kano and Tafawa Balewa were among the founders of the Northern People's Congress (NPC) which dominated the governments of the Northern region and of the Federation. The Bauchi General Improvement Association was an avenue for  Zungur to express his radical views, opposed to the Emir's autocracy and the British indirect rule system. He called for modernisation through adoption of Western Education. Although Zungur never recovered his health fully, he entered nationalist party politics at an early stage and was a member of the National Council of Nigeria and the Cameroons (NCNC). In 1948 he was elected as General Secretary by the NCNC under the presidency of Dr Nnamdi Azikwe. Zungur worked in this post for a short time in Lagos and later joined the Jami'yyar Mutanen Arewa in 1949, the organisation which became the NPC, because he believed the NCNC was neglecting North's peculiar problems. He later left NCPC and worked for Aminu Kano's Northern Elements Progressive Union (NEPU).

Later life and death 
Being too ill to play important role in Northern Nigeria's politics, Zungur remained influential behind the scenes for a while longer and was also a known poet. He died on 28 January 1958 before the independence of Nigeria in 1960.

References 

1915 births
1958 deaths
People from Bauchi State
People from colonial Nigeria
Yaba Higher College alumni
20th-century Nigerian politicians
Nigerian schoolteachers
National Council of Nigeria and the Cameroons politicians